George Sherwood Richardson (1896–1988) was an American engineer known for his elegant bridges, innovative construction techniques and skillful planning of highways. Designer of many bridges in the Pittsburgh and Allegheny County areas in the 20th century, he has been called "the dean of Pittsburgh bridge engineers".

Early life and education
Born in Georgetown, Colorado, he served in World War I prior to graduating from the University of Colorado in 1920.

Engineering career
After a stint with the Wyoming Department of Highways and time on the faculty of the University of Pennsylvania, Richardson moved to Pittsburgh in 1922 to work for the American Bridge Company before he joined the Allegheny County Department of Public Works in 1924, where he went on to rise to be assistant chief engineer by the time he left in 1937.

Richardson, Gordon & Associates 
In 1939 he founded his own firm, as George S. Richardson, Consulting Engineer; after taking on partners, the firm was renamed to Richardson, Gordon & Associates in 1955. It has been involved in the planning and design of many major highway projects across the United States. In the 1980s, the company was acquired by international architectural and engineering conglomerate HDR, Inc.

Among other notable work, the firm created the erection process and custom equipment used to put up the Eero Saarinen-designed Saint Louis Gateway Arch.

Richardson retired in 1973 and moved from Pittsburgh in 1975, splitting time between homes in Tucson, Arizona and Coloardo Springs, Colorado. He died of a heart attack at the age of 92 at his home in Colorado and was buried in Waterford, Pennsylvania.

Notable projects
 Pittsburgh Point Bridge II, 1925
 Liberty Bridge, 1928
 McKees Rocks Bridge, 1931
 George Westinghouse Bridge, 1932
 West End Bridge, 1932
 Tenth Street / Philip Murray Bridge, 1933
 Homestead Grays Bridge, 1936
 Jerome Street Bridge, 1937 
 Delaware River–Turnpike Toll Bridge, 1955
 Fort Pitt Bridge, 1959 
 Fort Duquesne Bridge, 1963
 Fern Hollow Bridge, 1973

Industry service
 American Society of Civil Engineers - National Director
 American Institute of Consulting Engineers - President
 American Road Builders' Association, Engineering Division - President

Awards
 National Society of Professional Engineers. Pittsburgh, Pennsylvania Chapter - Distinguished Service Award
 American Society of Military Engineers - Distinguished Service Award
In 1987, the Engineer's Society of Western Pennsylvania established the George S. Richardson medal, which has since been awarded annually for an outstanding achievement in bridge engineering.

References

1896 births
1988 deaths
American civil engineers
University of Colorado alumni
University of Pennsylvania faculty
People from Georgetown, Colorado
20th-century American engineers